George Lloyd may refer to:
George Lloyd, 1st Baron Lloyd (1879–1941), British politician and colonial administrator
George Lloyd (politician) (1815–1897), member of the New South Wales Legislative Assembly
George Lloyd (bishop of Chester) (1560–1615), Bishop of Sodor and Man and Bishop of Chester, 1605–1614
George Exton Lloyd (1861–1940), Bishop of Saskatchewan, 1922–1931
George Lloyd (actor) (1892–1967), American actor
George Lloyd (composer) (1913–1998), British composer
George Butler Lloyd (1854–1930), British Member of Parliament for Shrewsbury, 1913–1922
George Lloyd (RAF officer) (1892–1955), World War I flying ace
George Lloyd (1900s footballer) (fl. 1901–1908), English association football player
George Lloyd (scholar) (1708–1783), English Fellow of the Royal Society
Peter Lloyd (aviator) (George Alfred Lloyd, born 1920), Australian sports aviator
George Lloyd (archaeologist) (1820–1885), English Anglican curate and archaeologist
George Lloyd (footballer, born 2000), English association football player
George Loyd (1843–1892), U.S. Army soldier and Medal of Honor recipient
George A. Loyd, Union Army private and Medal of Honor recipient

See also
George Floyd (disambiguation), a similar name of identical etymology
Lloyd George (disambiguation)